Knight Ridder  was an American media company, specializing in newspaper and Internet publishing. Until it was bought by McClatchy on June 27, 2006, it was the second largest newspaper publisher in the United States, with 32 daily newspaper brands sold. Its headquarters were located in San Jose, California.

History

Origins
As anti-German sentiment increased in the interwar period, Ridder successfully transitioned into English language publishing by acquiring The Journal of Commerce in 1926.

Both companies went public in 1969 and merged on July 11, 1974. For a brief time, the combined company was the largest newspaper publisher in the United States.

At its peak
Knight Ridder had a long history of innovation in technology. It was the first newspaper publisher to experiment with videotex when it launched its Viewtron system in 1983. After investing six years of research and $50 million into the service, Knight Ridder shut down Viewtron in 1986 when the service's interactivity features proved more popular than news delivery.

Knight-Ridder purchased Dialog Information Services Inc. from Lockheed Corporation in August 1988. In October 1988, the company placed its eight broadcast television stations up for sale to reduce debt and to pay for the purchase of Dialog.

In 1997, when Tony Ridder was CEO, it bought four newspapers from The Walt Disney Company formerly owned by Capital Cities Communications, after Disney's purchase of Cap Cities mainly for the ABC television network (The Kansas City Star, Fort Worth Star-Telegram, Belleville News-Democrat and (Wilkes-Barre) Times Leader for $1.65 billion. It was, at the time, the most expensive newspaper acquisition in history.

For most of its existence, the company was based in Miami, with headquarters on the top floor of the Miami Herald building. In 1998, Knight Ridder relocated its headquarters from Miami to San Jose, Calif.; there, that city's Mercury News—the first daily newspaper to regularly publish its full content online—was booming along with the rest of Silicon Valley. The internet division had been established there three years earlier. The company rented several floors in a downtown high-rise as its new corporate base.

In November 2005, the company announced plans for "strategic initiatives," which involved the possible sale of the company. This came after three major institutional shareholders publicly urged management to put the company up for sale. At the time, the company had a higher profit margin than many Fortune 500 companies, including ExxonMobil.

Iraq War
In the run-up to the 2003 invasion of Iraq, Knight Ridder DC Bureau reporters Jonathan Landay and Warren Strobel wrote a series of articles critical of purported intelligence suggesting links between Saddam Hussein, the obtainment of weapons of mass destruction, and Al-Qaeda, citing anonymous sources.

Landay and Strobel's stories ran counter to reports by The New York Times, The Washington Post and other national publications, resulting in some newspapers within Knight-Ridder chain refusing to run the two reporter's stories. After the war and the discrediting of many initial news reports written and carried by others, Strobel and Landay received the Raymond Clapper Memorial Award from the Senate Press Gallery on February 5, 2004, for their coverage.

The Huffington Post headlined the two as "the reporting team that got Iraq right". The Columbia Journalism Review described the reporting as "unequaled by the Bigfoots working at higher-visibility outlets such as the New York Times, the Washington Post, the Wall Street Journal and the Los Angeles Times".

Later after the war, their work was featured in Bill Moyers' PBS documentary "Buying The War" and was dramatized in the 2017 film Shock and Awe.

Purchase by McClatchy
On March 13, 2006, The McClatchy Company announced its agreement to purchase Knight Ridder for a purchase price of $6.5 billion in cash, stock and debt. The deal gave McClatchy 32 daily newspapers in 29 markets, with a total circulation of 3.3 million. However, for various reasons, McClatchy decided immediately to resell twelve of these papers.

On April 26, 2006, McClatchy announced it was selling the San Jose Mercury News, Contra Costa Times, Monterey Herald, and St. Paul Pioneer Press to MediaNews Group (with backing from the Hearst Corporation) for $1 billion.

List of newspapers
Daily newspapers owned by Knight Ridder and its predecessors – listed alphabetically by place of publication – included:

 The American News (Aberdeen, South Dakota), 1928–2006
 Akron Beacon Journal (Akron, Ohio), 1903–2006
 Belleville News-Democrat (Belleville, Illinois), 1997–2006
 The Bellingham Herald (Bellingham, Washington), 2005–2006
 Sun Herald (Biloxi, Mississippi), 1986–2006
 Boca Raton News (Boca Raton, Florida), 1969–1997
 The Idaho Statesman (Boise, Idaho), 2005–2006
 The Daily Camera (Boulder, Colorado), 1969–1997
 The Herald (Bradenton) (Bradenton, Florida), 1973–2006
 The Charlotte Observer (Charlotte, North Carolina), 1955–2006
 Chicago Daily News (Chicago, Illinois), 1944–1959
 The State (Columbia, South Carolina), 1986–2006
 Columbus Ledger-Enquirer (Columbus, Georgia), 1973–2006
 Detroit Free Press (Detroit, Michigan), 1940–2005
 Duluth News Tribune (Duluth, Minnesota), 1936–2006
 The News-Sentinel (Fort Wayne, Indiana), 1980–2006
 Fort Worth Star-Telegram (Fort Worth, Texas), 1997–2006
 The Post-Tribune (Gary, Indiana), 1966–1998
 Grand Forks Herald (Grand Forks, North Dakota), 1929–2006
 The Kansas City Star (Kansas City, Missouri), 1997–2006
 Lexington Herald-Leader (Lexington, Kentucky), 1973–2006
 Long Beach Press-Telegram (Long Beach, California), 1952–1997
 The Telegraph (Macon, Georgia), 1969–2006
 Florida Keys Keynoter (Marathon, Florida), 1956-2006
 The Miami Herald (Miami, Florida), 1937–2006
 El Nuevo Herald (Miami, Florida), 1977–2006
 The Monterey County Herald (Monterey, California), 1997–2006
 The Sun News (Myrtle Beach, South Carolina), 1986–2006
 The Journal of Commerce (New York City), 1926–1995
 The Olathe News (Olathe, Kansas), 2000–2006
 The Olympian (Olympia, Washington), 2005–2006
 Palo Alto Daily News (Palo Alto, California), 2005–2006
 Pasadena Star-News (Pasadena, California), 1956–1989
 Philadelphia Daily News (Philadelphia, Pennsylvania), 1969–2006
 The Philadelphia Inquirer (Philadelphia, Pennsylvania), 1969–2006
 St. Paul Pioneer Press (St. Paul, Minnesota), 1927–2006
 San Jose Mercury News (San Jose, California), 1952–2006
 The Tribune (San Luis Obispo, California), 1997–2006
 Centre Daily Times (State College, Pennsylvania), 1979–2006
 Tallahassee Democrat (Tallahassee, Florida), 1965–2005
 Contra Costa Times (Walnut Creek, California), 1995–2006
 The Wichita Eagle (Wichita, Kansas), 1973–2006
 Times Leader (Wilkes-Barre, Pennsylvania), 1997–2006

Knight Ridder-owned companies
A list of companies that were at one time or another owned by Knight Ridder:
 Vu/Text: 1982–1996. Merged with PressLink to become MediaStream.
 PressLink: ??–1996. Merged with Vu/Text to become MediaStream.
 MediaStream: 1996–2001. Acquired by NewsBank
 DataStar: Acquired from Radio Schweiz Ltd., merged with Dialog to form Knight Ridder Information
 Dialog (online database): Merged with DataStar to form Knight Ridder Information
 Knight Ridder Information: ??–1997, Acquired by MAID, later by Thomson
 Knight Ridder Financial Inc: 1985–1996. Acquired by Global Financial trading as Bridge Data.
 RealCities Network: 2004–2006. RealCities was a portal/hub website for Knight-Ridder group. It was absorbed with The McClatchy Company into McClatchy Interactive and sold to Chicago-based Centro in 2008.

Knight Ridder-owned television stations
Knight Newspapers entered broadcasting in 1946 via the purchase of minority ownership stakes in WQAM in Miami, WIND in Chicago, and WAKR in Akron; all three stations were in markets served by a Knight newspaper. The minority stake in WAKR's parent company, Summit Radio, also included the establishment of WAKR-TV (channel 49), as well as WAKR-FM (97.5) and six radio stations purchased in Dayton, Ohio, Dallas, Texas, and Denver, Colorado. WAKR-TV was built and signed on by Summit on July 23, 1953, as the Akron market's ABC affiliate, moving to channel 23 on December 1, 1967. Knight Ridder divested its stake in Summit Radio by 1977; a planned merger between the two entities in 1968 failed to be consummated.

In 1954, Ridder Newspapers launched WDSM-TV in Superior, Wisconsin, serving the Duluth, Minnesota market. Initially a CBS affiliate, it switched to its present NBC affiliation a year and a half after the station's launch. It was spun off after Ridder's merger with Knight Newspapers, Inc.

From 1956 to 1962, Knight and the Cox publishing family jointly operated Biscayne Television, which owned NBC affiliate WCKT in Miami, Florida, as well as WCKR radio, which this entity purchased from Cox; Knight sold off WQAM to a third party as part of Biscayne's formation. Revelations of improper behavior and underhanded tactics by Biscayne and National Airlines (which signed on WPST-TV, also in Miami) to secure their licenses, along with ethics violations within the FCC itself, resulted in the licenses for both stations being revoked. A replacement license for WCKT was granted in 1960 to Sunbeam Television, the lone bidder for the prior license not to have engaged in any unethical behavior; Biscayne sold to Sunbeam WCKT's non-license assets: the studios, intellectual property and all off- and on-air personnel for the new station, which took the WCKT name for continuity. Cox repurchased WCKR, reviving that station's prior WIOD call sign.

Following the divestment of their stake in Summit Radio, Knight Ridder acquired Poole Broadcasting, which consisted of WJRT-TV in Flint, Michigan, WTEN in Albany, New York and its satellite WCDC in Adams, Massachusetts, and WPRI-TV in Providence, Rhode Island. Immediately after the acquisition of these stations was finalized, Knight Ridder cut a corporate affiliation deal with ABC, switching then-CBS affiliates WTEN/WCDC and WPRI (the latter of which eventually rejoined CBS) to ABC (WJRT was already affiliated with ABC when the affiliation deal was made). As part of the deal, Poole Broadcasting would eventually become Knight Ridder Broadcasting. Knight Ridder would acquire several television stations in medium-sized markets during the 1980s, including three stations owned by The Detroit News which the Gannett Company—which purchased the newspaper in 1986—could not keep due to Federal Communications Commission regulations on media cross-ownership and/or television duopolies then in effect. (None of Knight Ridder's later acquisitions changed their network affiliations under Knight Ridder ownership; for example, then-NBC affiliate WALA-TV in Mobile, Alabama remained an NBC affiliate when it was owned by Knight Ridder and would switch to Fox several years after Knight Ridder sold the station.)

In early 1989, Knight Ridder announced its exit from broadcasting, selling all of its stations to separate buyers; the sales were finalized in the summer and early fall of that year. This deal was made in order to reduce their debt loads from the proceedings. One of the stations, WALA-TV went to Burnham Broadcasting for $40 million, while WKRN would go to Young Broadcasting for $50 million, KOLD-TV to News-Press & Gazette Company for an undisclosed price, and two television stations WPRI and WTKR to Narragansett Television L.P. for $150 million on February 18, 1989. This was followed by the following month with the sale of KTVY-TV to WHO-TV owner Palmer Communications, for $50 million. WTEN was the next-to-last station to be sold, going to Young Broadcasting for $38 million, and WJRT would eventually becoming the final Knight Ridder station, to be sold to SJL Broadcasting for $39 million.

Media

• Shock and Awe, 2018 film about a group of journalists at Knight Ridder's Washington Bureau who investigate the reasons behind the Bush Administration's 2003 invasion of Iraq.

Notable people
 Lee Hills

References

Further reading

External links

 Knight Ridder - Chronology (Archive)
 Knight Ridder Washington Bureau

Knight Ridder
McClatchy
1933 establishments in Ohio
2006 disestablishments in California
Companies based in San Jose, California
Defunct companies based in the San Francisco Bay Area
Defunct broadcasting companies of the United States
Defunct financial data vendors
Mass media companies established in 1933
Mass media companies disestablished in 2006
Mass media in the San Francisco Bay Area
Ridder family
2006 mergers and acquisitions
1933 establishments in California